Michael Mendillo is a professor of astronomy at Boston University. His primary research interests include space physics, planetary atmospheres, observations and models. He is a Fellow of the American Geophysical Union and a longtime member of the American Astronomical Society.

Biography
In 1966, Mendillo received his B.S. in physics from Providence College. In 1971, Mendillo received his Ph.D. from Boston University in physics and astronomy.

Mendillo became a professor of astronomy at Boston University in 1985, where he presently works.

Research
Mendillo leads a research group that has developed new imaging techniques for observations of emissions from the atmospheres of the Earth, other planets and moons. With the help of his research group, Mendillo led the discoveries of extraordinary large, tenuous atmospheres of sodium gas on Jupiter, on the Moon and in comet Hale–Bopp. He is also known for his work on Active Experiments, the research technique of introducing known gaseous perturbations into space plasmas, observing the effects, and deriving the basic physical processes that govern the system.

Selected publications

References

External links
 Mendillo's CSP Profile

Year of birth missing (living people)
Living people
American physicists
Boston University faculty
Fellows of the American Geophysical Union
Boston University alumni
Providence College alumni